Psaltoda fumipennis, commonly known as the smoking sage, is a species of cicada native to Queensland in eastern Australia. It was described by Howard Ashton in 1912.

References

Hemiptera of Australia
Insects described in 1912
Psaltodini